Chvátal (feminine Chvátalová) is a Czech surname. It is occasionally spelled Chwatal. Notable people include:

 Cynthia Chvatal, an American producer
 Janet Chvatal (born 1964), an American classical singer, author, producer
 Juraj Chvátal (born 1996), Slovak footballer
  (born 1979), Austrian actress
 Martin Ferdinand Chvátal (Quadal) (1736–1811), Moravian-Austrian painter
 Václav "Vašek" Chvátal (born 1946), Czech-Canadian mathematician
 Chvátal graph
 Bondy–Chvátal theorem, named after John Adrian Bondy
 Chvatal art gallery theorem
  (1897–1963), German Nazi politician
  (1811–1887), Bohemian-born German organ maker
 Franz Xaver Chwatal (1808–1879), Bohemian (Czech) composer and music educator

See also
 

Czech-language surnames
Slovak-language surnames